This is a list of the most important tourist sites in Satu Mare, Romania.

Places of worship 
 Chain Church
 SS. Michael and Gabriel
 Roman Catholic-Cathedral
 Kűltelki Reformed Church
 Greek-Catholic Cathedral
 Dormition of Virgin Mary Cathedral
 Orthodox Church
 Calvaria Roman Catholic Church
 Satu Mare Synagogue

Historical buildings 
 Firemen's Tower
 Dacia Hotel
 Astoria Hotel
 Episcopal Palace
 Railway Station
 County Library
 The North Theater
 County Museum
 Art Museum
 Creation Shop Paul Erdos
 Dinu Lipatti Phylharmonic
 Dana II Hotel
 Villa Bodi

Statues and historical monuments 
 Monument of the Romanian Soldier
 Capitoline Wolf Statue

Bridges 
 Decebal Bridge
 Golescu Bridge
 Iron Bridge
 Yellow Bridge

Modern buildings 
 Administrative Palace
 Aurora Hotel
 Traian Plaza
 Nisco City Center
 Coral Hotel
 Dana Hotel
 Dana Complex
 Select World Tower

 Places in Satu Mare